The Urgals are a fictional race in Christopher Paolini's Inheritance Cycle.  Urgal may also refer to:

Novy Urgal, an urban-type settlement in Khabarovsk Krai, Russia
Sredny Urgal, a former urban-type settlement in Khabarovsk Krai, Russia; since 1997—a rural locality (selo)
Ust-Urgal, a rural locality (a selo) in Khabarovsk Krai, Russia